Kaseh Garan (also Romanized as Kāseh Garān and Kāseh-ye Gerān; also known as Kāsākran and Kāseh Karān) is a village in Cheleh Rural District, in the Central District of Gilan-e Gharb County, Kermanshah Province, Iran. At the 2006 census, its population was 231, in 55 families.

References 

Populated places in Gilan-e Gharb County